The Badgerow Building is a historic structure located in downtown Sioux City, Iowa, United States. It was the tallest building in Sioux City for many years. It was listed on the National Register of Historic Places in 1982. The Badgerow Building was voted one of the 50 Most Significant Iowa Buildings of the 20th Century by the Iowa Chapter of the American Institute of Architects. It was one of five buildings that represented the 1930s.

Architecture
The building was designed by Sioux City architectural firm of K. E. Westerlind, and was completed in 1933 in the Art Deco style.  The facade is composed of terra cotta and features vertical piers, bronze ornamentation, and windows that are highlighted by the geometric ornamentation.  A head of a Native American is a recurring theme in the ornamentation.  The interior features a lobby with walls of black Belgian marble and pink Tennessee marble, and terrazzo floors.

References

Office buildings completed in 1933
Buildings and structures in Sioux City, Iowa
National Register of Historic Places in Sioux City, Iowa
Office buildings on the National Register of Historic Places in Iowa
Office buildings in Iowa
Art Deco architecture in Iowa
1933 establishments in Iowa